The Campus Chronicle was a tabloid at the University of Massachusetts Amherst for faculty and staff. It was published weekly during the academic year. The Chronicle operated with funding from the state, and ceased publication in 2003 during statewide budget cuts.

References

External links
The Campus Chronicle Online
Some numbers of the Chronicle

Student newspapers published in Massachusetts
University of Massachusetts Amherst
Publications established in 1985
Publications disestablished in 2003
1985 establishments in Massachusetts